How the West Was Won was a 2-LP album recorded in July 1959  at United Recorders, Hollywood, for Bing Crosby's own company, Project Records. It was released by RCA Victor in 1960 and featured Crosby, Rosemary Clooney as well as other singers. The backing orchestra was conducted by Bob Thompson.

The records were issued with automatic couplings, i.e. LOP 6070-1 - sides 1 and 3, LOP 6070-2 - sides 2 and 4.

Reception
Billboard liked the album, saying "This handsome set is sure to attract. The striking cover and informative booklet are perfect complements to the fine album contents which are interpreted by a stellar line-up of artists. The two-disk set offers a heap of Americana in narrated form. Strongest potential."

Track listing

CD
Bing's songs from the album were released on CD as Lillis, Love and a Little Covered Wagon (catalog number HLVCD-004).
In 2007 the complete album was re-released on CD by Bear Family Records (BCD-16634-AR).

References

1960 albums
RCA Victor albums
Bing Crosby albums